The YF-20 is a Chinese liquid-fuel rocket engine burning N2O4 and UDMH in a gas generator cycle. It is a basic engine which when mounted in a four engine module forms the YF-21. The high altitude variation is known as the YF-22 is normally paired with the YF-23 vernier to form the YF-24 propulsion module for second stages. New versions when used individually for booster applications are called YF-25.

Versions
The basic engine has been used since the Feng Bao 1 rocket and has been the main propulsion of the Long March 2, Long March 3 and Long March 4 families.

 YF-20: Core engine. Flown originally on the Feng Bao 1 and Long March 2A.
 YF-20A: Core engine.
 YF-20B (a.k.a. DaFY5-1): Core engine, also used on the boosters.
 YF-20C: Core engine, also used on the boosters.
 YF-20D: Core engine, also used on the boosters.
 YF-20E: Core engine, also used on the boosters.
 YF-22: Upper stage version with enlarged nozzle are ratio. Flown originally on the Feng Bao 1 second stage with no verniers, and on the Long March 2A with the YF-23 verniers as the YF-24.
 YF-22A: Upper stage version.
 YF-22B (a.k.a. DaFY20-1): Upper stage version.
 YF-22C: Upper stage version.
 YF-22D: Upper stage version.
 YF-22E: Upper stage version.
 YF-25: Booster stage version.

Modules
While the basic engine was used multiple times, it was only used as a single engine for booster application. It is usually bundled into modules of multiple engines.

The relevant modules for first stage application are:
 YF-21: A module comprising four YF-20. Flown originally on the Feng Bao 1 and Long March 2A.
 YF-21A: A module comprising four YF-20A. Improved version.
 YF-21B (a.k.a. DaFY6-2): A module comprising four YF-20B. Improved version which increased thrust by 7%.
 YF-21C: A module comprising four YF-20C. Improved version.
 YF-21D: A module comprising four YF-20D. Improved version.
 YF-21E: A module comprising four YF-20E. Improved version.

The relevant modules for second stage application are:
 YF-24: A module comprising an YF-22 and a YF-23 vernier. First flown on the Long March 2A.
 YF-24A: A module comprising an YF-22A and a YF-23A verniers.
 YF-24B: A module comprising an YF-22B and a YF-23B verniers.
 YF-24C: A module comprising an YF-22C and a YF-23C verniers.
 YF-24D: A module comprising an YF-22D and a YF-23D verniers.
 YF-24E: A module comprising an YF-22E and a YF-23E verniers.

References

Rocket engines of China
Rocket engines using hypergolic propellant
Rocket engines using the gas-generator cycle